David Rice may refer to:
 Dave Rice (American football) (born c. 1940), former American college football coach
 Dave Rice (basketball) (born 1968), American college basketball coach
 David Rice (bishop), 15th Anglican Bishop of Waiapu
 David Rice (Presbyterian minister) (1733–1816), antebellum Presbyterian minister and antislavery advocate
 David Rice (psychiatrist) (1914–1997), English psychiatrist, naval officer and first-class cricketer
 David Rice (tennis) (born 1989), British tennis player
 David Rice (convict) (1947–2016), American convicted of murdering an Omaha, Nebraska police officer in the Rice/Poindexter case
 David Lewis Rice (born 1958), American, murderer of civil rights attorney Charles Goldmark and his family; convicted and sentenced to death
 David Talbot Rice (1903–1972), British art historian